Lee Shiunn-long (born 19 October 1958) is a Taiwanese sprinter. He competed in the men's 100 metres at the 1988 Summer Olympics.

References

1958 births
Living people
Athletes (track and field) at the 1988 Summer Olympics
Taiwanese male sprinters
Olympic athletes of Taiwan
Place of birth missing (living people)